Tsvetoslav Petrov (Bulgarian: Цветослав Петров; born 29 May 1999) is a Bulgarian footballer who plays as a forward for Ludogorets Razgrad.

Career
Petrov made his professional debut for Ludogorets in a league match against Slavia Sofia.

Career statistics

Club

References

External links
 

1999 births
Living people
Bulgarian footballers
Bulgaria youth international footballers
PFC Ludogorets Razgrad II players
PFC Ludogorets Razgrad players
First Professional Football League (Bulgaria) players
Second Professional Football League (Bulgaria) players
Association football defenders
People from Vidin